Ōhau River may refer to two watercourses in New Zealand:

Ōhau River (Canterbury)
Ōhau River (Manawatū-Whanganui)